Trail to Laredo is a 1948 American Western film directed by Ray Nazarro and written by Barry Shipman. The film stars Charles Starrett, Jim Bannon, Virginia Maxey, Tommy Ivo, Hugh Prosser and Smiley Burnette. The film was released on August 12, 1948, by Columbia Pictures.

Plot

Cast          
Charles Starrett as Steve Ellison / The Durango Kid
Jim Bannon as Dan Parks
Virginia Maxey as Classy
Tommy Ivo as Ronnie Parks
Hugh Prosser as Fenton
Smiley Burnette as Smiley Burnette
George Chesebro as Walt Morgan
John Merton as Sheriff Kenney
John Cason as Blaze
Robert J. Wilke as Duke
Ted Mapes as Chuck

References

External links
 

1948 films
1940s English-language films
American Western (genre) films
1948 Western (genre) films
Columbia Pictures films
Films directed by Ray Nazarro
American black-and-white films
1940s American films